Édison David Bilbao Zárate (born 3 June 1987), known as Edison Bilbao, is a Chilean football playerwho plays as a midfielder.

Early life
Born in Santiago, Chile, Bilbao moved to the United States at the age of eleven, making his home in Newark, New Jersey.

Career
As a youth player, Bilbao was with Colo-Colo in his homeland and New York MetroStars in the United States. In colo-Colo, he coincided with players such as Arturo Vidal, Felipe Flores and Juan Pablo Arenas. After stints with Newark Ironbound Express and New Jersey Ironmen, he moved outside the United States and has played for clubs in Russia, Portugal, Costa Rica, Malta and Chile.

Personal life
His twin brother, also has played football and studied along with him.

Honours
New York Cosmos
 NASL: 2013

References

External links
 
 Edison Bilbao at PlaymakerStats.com

1987 births
Living people
Chilean footballers
Chilean expatriate footballers
USL League Two players
Jersey Express S.C. players
Major Indoor Soccer League (2001–2008) players
New Jersey Ironmen (MISL) players
FC Torpedo Moscow players
Liga Portugal 2 players
Primeira Liga players
C.D.C. Montalegre players
U.D. Leiria players
Segunda División de Costa Rica players
A.D. Ramonense players
North American Soccer League players
New York Cosmos (2010) players
Maltese Premier League players
Qormi F.C. players
Balzan F.C. players
Birkirkara F.C. players
Mosta F.C. players
Gżira United F.C. players
Gudja United F.C. players
Tarxien Rainbows F.C. players
Għajnsielem F.C. players
Primera B de Chile players
Santiago Morning footballers
Chilean expatriate sportspeople in the United States
Chilean expatriate sportspeople in Russia
Chilean expatriate sportspeople in Portugal
Chilean expatriate sportspeople in Costa Rica
Chilean expatriate sportspeople in Malta
Expatriate soccer players in the United States
Expatriate footballers in Russia
Expatriate footballers in Portugal
Expatriate footballers in Costa Rica
Expatriate footballers in Malta
Association football midfielders
Chilean twins
Twin sportspeople